Joseph Michael Woodiwiss (born November 2002) is a professional footballer who plays as a defender for Pontypridd United on loan from League Two club Newport County.

Career
Woodiwiss is a product of the Newport County Academy. On 12 November 2019 Woodiwiss made his debut for Newport in the starting line up for the 7–4 win against Cheltenham Town in the EFL Trophy Southern Group E. In June 2021 he signed his first professional contract with Newport County. On 14 January 2021 Woodiwiss joined Merthyr Town on loan for the remainder of the 2021-22 season. On 2 August 2022 he joined Pontypridd Town on loan until 3 January 2023.

External links

References

2002 births
Living people
Association football defenders
Newport County A.F.C. players
Welsh footballers
Merthyr Town F.C. players